WMMA (1480 AM) is a radio station licensed to the community of Irondale, Alabama, United States, and serving the greater Birmingham, Alabama, area.  The station, which began broadcasting in 1960, is currently owned by La Promesa Foundation. It airs a Catholic radio format including some programming provided by EWTN.

History
This station began broadcasting in December 1960 as WIXI with 5,000 watts of power, daytime-only, on 1480 kHz under the ownership of the Jefferson Radio Company.  The station's initial format included 45 hours per week of country & western music and 20 hours per week of what was then called "Negro" music.

The station was sold to the Birmingham Broadcasting Company in a transaction consummated on September 8, 1964.  In 1965, the new owners had the station's call sign changed to WLPH.  The station aired a primarily country music format through the late 1960s.

In 1971, WLPH transitioned to a religious radio format featuring Southern Gospel music. The license holding company changed its name to the Alabama Religious Broadcasting Company to reflect the new direction for the station.

In March 1997, Alabama Religious Broadcasting Company reached an agreement to sell this station to Willis Broadcasting of Norfolk, Virginia, through its Birmingham Christian Radio, Inc., subsidiary.  The deal was approved by the FCC on May 13, 1997, and the transaction was consummated on August 22, 1997.  The new owners shifted the music played on WLPH to a "Black Gospel" format.

In July 2006, Birmingham Christian Radio, Inc., reached an agreement to sell this station to Davidson Broadcasting through their Davidson Media Station WLPH Licensee, LLC, subsidiary.  The deal was approved by the FCC on September 8, 2006, and the transaction was consummated on November 3, 2006.  The new owners had the station's call sign changed to WRLM on November 7, 2006.  As WRLM, this station broadcast a Hispanic-oriented music format branded as "Latino Mix".

Current status
In March 2008, Davidson Media Group LLC sold the station to Queen of Heaven Catholic Radio Inc. for a reported $575,000.  The deal was approved by the FCC on May 29, 2008, and the transaction was consummated on June 12, 2008.

The station was assigned the WQOH call letters by the Federal Communications Commission on June 27, 2008. The station began broadcasting the Catholic radio programming format on July 21, 2008.  The new owner holds a construction permit for nighttime operation with the station power reduced to 28 watts.

On December 30, 2014, Queen of Heaven donated WQOH to Divine Word Communications.

WQOH, six other stations, and four translators were sold by Divine Word Communications to La Promesa Foundation effective January 8, 2016, at a purchase price of $1,073,907.59.

As of October 26, 2016, the calls have changed to WMMA.  A new relay for this station is now in the works.  Once built, it'll be located at 97.9 FM and cover the city of Irondale.

References

External links
WQOH official website

MMA (AM)
Catholic radio stations
Radio stations established in 1960
1960 establishments in Alabama
MMA (AM)